Emma Chadwick, née Emma Hilma Amalia Löwstädt (10 August 1855, Stockholm – 2 January 1932, Avignon), was a Swedish painter who specialized in genre scenes and portraits.

Biography
Her father,  was a master tailor. She began her artistic education at the Technical School, then studied at the Royal Swedish Academy of Fine Arts from 1874 to 1880. In 1881, after having spent the previous summers on the French coast, she went to Paris to finish her studies at the Académie Julian with Jean Charles Cazin and Tony Robert-Fleury. She had her first showing at the Salon her first year there. 

She eventually settled in at the Swedish artists' colony in Grez-sur-Loing, where she met her husband, the American painter Francis Brooks Chadwick. They married and bought an inn there in 1887, which became a popular meeting place for the expatriate artists. Five years later, they built a villa on the same property. While living there, she travelled extensively, visiting Brittany with her friend, Amanda Sidwall, and accompanying her husband on trips to Spain, North Africa, Italy, the United States and England. When an old friend from the Academy, Anders Zorn, came to visit, he remarked that she was beginning to forget how to speak Swedish.

She  exhibited   her work at the Palace of Fine Arts at the 1893 World's Columbian Exposition in Chicago, Illinois and continued to participate in exhibits at the Salon until 1924.

Her sister, Eva Löwstädt-Åström, was also a well known artist. 

Chadwick was included in the 2018 exhibit Women in Paris 1850-1900.

Selected paintings

References

Further reading

External links
 
 Biography @ the Svenskt Biografiskt Lexikon
 Emma Lowstadt-Chadwick on Artnet

1855 births
1932 deaths
Artists from Stockholm
Swedish women painters
19th-century Swedish painters
20th-century Swedish painters
19th-century Swedish women artists
20th-century Swedish women artists